John Peter Caffery (May 21, 1879 – February 2, 1919) was a Canadian track and field athlete who competed in the marathon at the 1908 Summer Olympics where he finished in 11th place. Caffrey was also a two-time champion of the Boston Marathon. He won with a time of 2:39:44.4 in 1900 and with a time of 2:29:23.6 in 1901, both of which were course records for the then 25-mile course.

Caffrey was the son of Irish immigrants. He was a teamster by trade and represented St. Patrick's Athletic Association/St. Patrick's Athletic Club. He was born in Hamilton, Ontario and died there from complications after falling ill with Spanish flu.

See also
List of winners of the Boston Marathon

References

External links
list of Canadian athletes

1879 births
1919 deaths
Athletes from Hamilton, Ontario
Canadian people of Irish descent
Canadian male marathon runners
Olympic track and field athletes of Canada
Athletes (track and field) at the 1908 Summer Olympics
Deaths from Spanish flu
Boston Marathon male winners

Canadian male long-distance runners